Holy See–Romania relations are foreign relations between the Holy See and Romania.  Both countries established diplomatic relations in 1920.  The Holy See has an embassy in Bucharest.  Romania has an embassy to the Vatican.

History
From May 7, 1999 to May 9, 1999 Pope John Paul II made an official visit to Romania. It was the first papal trip to a predominantly Orthodox country in more than 1,000 years. He attended an Orthodox liturgy on May 9, 1999, marking the first time a pope has ever attended an Orthodox service.  In 2002 there were 1,028,401 Catholics in Romania, representing 4.7% of the country's population.

Pope Francis visited Romania from 31 May to 2 June 2019.

See also 
 Foreign relations of the Holy See
 Foreign relations of Romania
 Roman Catholicism in Romania

External links 
  Romanian embassy to the Holy See (in Italian and Romanian embassy only)

References

 

 
Bilateral relations of Romania
Romania